All motorized vehicles in Indonesia, including motorcycles, are required to have registration plates, which must be displayed at the front and back of the vehicles.

History

Colonial era 

Vehicle registration plates were first introduced in the Dutch East Indies in 1900. The early format included regional codes such as CH for Cirebon, SB for Surabaya, and SOK for the eastern coast of Sumatra; and registration numbers with no official standards. Plates were not always installed at the front and the rear of the vehicle; some owners affixed the plates on the side of the vehicle. For international purposes, the Government of the Dutch East Indies introduced the code IN for government vehicles. IN plates were elliptical and the registration numbers were placed below on a rectangular plate.

A more-structured system was introduced in 1917 with the implementation of regulations regarding the content of applications for number and driving licenses, the specification of numbers and letters, the models of number and driving licenses, the establishment of registers of holders of the licenses and the publication of the contents of the registers. The regulation obliged vehicle owners to register their vehicles. The Karesidenan-based system was first implemented on Java and afterwards elsewhere in the colony. The alphabetical codes were:

 A: Banten
 B: Batavia (now Jakarta)
 D: Preanger Regencies (now Greater Bandung)
 E: Cirebon
 G: Pekalongan
 H: Semarang
 K: Rembang
 L: Surabaya
 M: Madura
 N: Pasuruan
 P: Besuki
 R: Banyumas
 AA: Kedu
 AB: Special Region of Yogyakarta
 AD: Surakarta (Sragen Regency, Klaten Regency, Karanganyar Regency, Boyolali Regency)
 AE: Madiun (Ngawi Regency, Ponorogo Regency, Magetan Regency, Pacitan Regency)
 AG: Kediri (Tulungagung Regency, Blitar, Trenggalek Regency, Nganjuk Regency)
 BA: Western Coast of Sumatra
 BB: Tapanuli
 BD: Bengkulu
 BE: Lampung
 BG: Palembang
 BH: Jambi
 BK: East Sumatra
 BL:  Aceh
 BM: Riau
 BN: Bangka
 BP: Riau Islands
 BR: West Kalimantan
 DA: South Kalimantan and East Kalimantan
 DB: Manado
 DD: Sulawesi
 DE: Ambon
 DG: Ternate
 DH: Timor
 DK: Bali and Lombok

Until the 1920s, regional codes were added along with the Karesidenan regional expansion. For example, Bogor used the code F, Bojonegoro used the code S, and Western Papua used the code DS.

Post-colonial era

1980s 

The early format of registration plates remained in use after Indonesia proclaimed its independence in 1945. At the beginning of the 1980s, plates with four-digit numbers separated by a dot at the bottom that denote the month and year of expiry (e.g. 06•87) was introduced. Vehicle owners must pay a tax to renew the plate every five years. The typefaces are embossed. There were two variations of design during the New Order; the expiry date would be placed above or below the registration numbers.

21st Century 

Along with the increase of motorized vehicles in Indonesia, the technical design and specification of vehicle registration plates began to be regulated by the Direktorat Lalu Lintas Kepolisian Negara Republik Indonesia/Ditlantas Polri (Traffic Directorate) of the Indonesian National Police. In the lower left and upper right corners is the Traffic Police symbol, and at the lower-right and upper-left corners is a "DIRLANTAS POLRI" sign as a security feature and proof of the originality of the license plate.

In April 2011, the design of the license plate was redesigned. The new plates are  longer to accommodate more characters and the typeface is slimmer. The Traffic Corps of the Indonesian National Police (Korps Lalu Lintas Kepolisian Negara Republik Indonesia/Korlantas Polri) introduced their more-complete coat of arms, with shield and ribbon with the letter "Dharmakerta Marga Raksyaka". The phrase "DITLANTAS" became "KORLANTAS". The license plates are made from -thick aluminium with edge lines with the same color as the numbers.

Since June 2022, The Traffic Corps of the Indonesian National Police changed the color scheme for personal and rental vehicles from black plates with white letters to white plates with black letters. The new color scheme was implemented to ease the detection of motoring offenses with traffic enforcement cameras.

Registration plate design

Design convention 
With some exceptions, plates use the following format: LL NNNN LL where "L" are letters of the Latin alphabet, and "N" numbers from "0" to "9" (the first number is never a "0"). The first single-or-double-letter prefixes denote the area of registration. This is followed by number between 1 and 9999 without leading zeroes. This is then followed by one or two letters although they may be optional. For example: B 1766 RKO is a vehicle registered in East Jakarta city; it begins with B. A smaller, four-digit number separated by dot is located at the top (old format, with horizontal line as divider) or bottom (newer format, commonly without divider) of the plate with following format: NN・NN denoting the month and year of the plate's expiry (e.g. 01•28 means until January 2028). The owner must pay a tax to renew it every five years.

Special Code Examples

Jakarta 
In Jakarta, these codes are applied based on vehicle classes. These include:

 B – Code for Double Cabin Pickups
 A/B/D/W/E/R – Code for Sedans
 A/C/U/Z – Code for Pickups
 D – Code for Trucks
 F/K/O/Z/R/Y/I – Code for Minibuses
 *HX/*IX – Code for Ambulances
 J/L/C – Code for Jeeps and SUVs
 Q/U – Code for government staff
 T/*UA – Code for Taxis
 V/P/M/G/Y/W/U – Code for Minibuses

For example, "B 9031 BAY" indicates that the vehicle is a pickup, while "B 1032 DFA" indicates that the vehicle is a minibus.

State Servants 

A separate format exists for private vehicles belonging to government, military or police officials. Because most of these agencies are based in Jakarta, vehicles belonging to state officials use the "B" suffix, along with the four numbers that are assigned to the vehicle. The sub-area suffix is replaced with RF suffix code, indicating the vehicle belongs to a state official, followed by another letter that indicates the type of state official who owns the vehicle.

 "RFS" - Vehicle registration code intended for civil officials.
 "RFO", "RFH", and "RFQ" suffixes are intended for civil officials under the Echelon 2 rank role.
 "RFD" - Vehicle registration code intended for Indonesian Army officials.
 "RFL" - Vehicle registration code intended for Indonesian Navy officials.
 "RFU" - Vehicle registration code intended for Indonesian Air Force officials.
 "RFP" - Vehicle registration code intended for Indonesian National Police officials.

For example, "B 1703 RFS" indicates that the vehicle belongs to a civilian official, whilst "B 1148 RFP" indicates that the vehicle belongs to a police official.

On January 27, 2023, the Traffic Corps of the Indonesian National Police announced that special "RF" plates will be discontinued in October 2023, due to often being misused by numbers of people.

Color coding 

Vehicles in Indonesia are coded based on their classes and uses. These are:

 Black on White: For privately owned vehicles. Trucks that are registered for private use were issued with this plate, so are the ambulances. This new color scheme has been used since June 2022 to detect motoring offenses with traffic enforcement cameras.
 White on black: The old color scheme for privately owned vehicles. Trucks that are registered for private use were issued with this plate, so are ambulances. Superseded by the black on white color scheme but still valid during 5-year transition period.
 Red on white: Vehicles that have not been registered yet, or for new cars that have no owners yet or no legal identification.
 Black on yellow: Commercial vehicle or public transportation such as buses, taxis, angkot, auto rickshaws and commercial trucks.
 White on red: Used by fire departments, government ambulances, government officials and other governmental vehicles administered under their respective local governments.
 Black on Red: Vehicles belonging to foreign countries. Commonly used by foreign embassies or vehicles belonging to International organizations.
 Black on White with Black Trim: Vehicles belonging to diplomatic corps of foreign countries. Commonly used by foreign embassies or vehicles belonging to international organizations.
 Black on green: Free Zone vehicles i.e. Batam (see Indonesia–Malaysia–Singapore Growth Triangle).
 Blue on white: Vehicles belonging to foreign countries, mainly used before the vehicle has been registered.

Electric vehicles 

The Indonesian National Police has set a special license plate for electric vehicles with additional blue trim at the expiry date row in accordance with the regulations in the Decree of the Head of the Traffic Corps of the Indonesian National Police in 2020.

 White on Black with Blue Trim: for privately owned electric vehicles and rental electric vehicles
 Black on Yellow with Blue Trim: for commercial electric vehicle or public transportation.
 White on Red with Blue Trim: for governmental electric vehicles administered under their respective local governments.
 Black on White with Blue Trim: for foreign embassies or electric vehicles belonging to International organizations.
 Black on Green with Blue Trim: for electric vehicles at the Free Trade Zone.

Registration area codes 

The lettering convention denoting the area of registration is a legacy of the Dutch colonial era and does not reflect the current regional divisions of the country into provinces. They follow the old system of Dutch Karesidenan or residencies lettering systems, which were adopted in the 1920s, and the Territorial Police system which was abolished in 2010.

The list of area codes are:

Several areas provide license plates for non-motorized transport vehicles. In Yogyakarta, YB is used for rickshaws. A white-on-blue license plate with area code SB is issued for rickshaws operating in the city of Surabaya. In Banjarmasin, rickshaws operating in the city are issued with plate using a unique format, XXXX BS.

There were several area codes no longer in use. These include:
BR – ex Borneo Residency, western region
DF – East Timor
DS – Papua prior to 2016.

Special plate designs

Military and police vehicles 

Military and police vehicles have their own colors and alpha-numeric conventions, including their insignia and/or the rank of the officer owning the vehicle, especially for high-ranking officers.

Army-personnel vehicles are yellow on green background, plus a yellow star on the top. Navy-personnel plate is yellow on light blue, plus a yellow anchor. Air Force personnel plate is yellow on dark blue, plus a red and white air force roundel. Police plate is yellow on black. Personnel in Armed Forces Headquarters uses yellow numbers on red background plates. Slightly similar, Ministry of Defense vehicles also uses yellow on red plates, only replacing Armed Forces' insignia with the Ministry's insignia. This is also being implemented on other military vehicles, such as motorcycles, jeeps, trucks, and tanks.

Military and Ministry of Defense vehicles use the numerical convention NNNNN-SS where "N" is for numbers from "0" to "9" for registration and "S" denotes a special suffix number/letter which denotes the type of office or unit in which the person who owns the vehicle belongs to.

Here are the lists of the suffix codes of the Military and Ministry of Defense:

Senior government officials 

Vehicle registration plates belonging to senior government officials like the president or vice president always begin with RI which stands for "Republik Indonesia" and are followed by a number. For example, the president's registration plate is "RI-1", and the vice president's is "RI-2". Other senior officials such as government ministers, the chairman of the House of Representatives, the commander of the National Armed Forces and the chief of the National Police also share the same convention and are assigned the numbers after the President and vice president. These plates are used for everyday activities and have a white on black design.

There are some very special numbers, which are "INDONESIA 1" and "INDONESIA 2" for the president and vice president, respectively. These numbers are used for a ceremonial purposes, such as presidential/vice-presidential inaugurations, national day ceremonies and armed forces day. On inauguration day, at the time the new president and vice president take the oath, the plates are moved from the former presidential/vice-presidential cars to the new car. These numbers are also used for all ceremonial presidential/vice-presidential cars, and have a white-on-red design.

Foreign countries or international organizations 
Registration plates for vehicles belonging to the government of foreign countries or international organizations follow a different convention. They have black letters on a white background.

The plates have the letter CD followed by two or three digits denoting the country or organization, followed by up to three digits of the serial number. For example, a car with number CD 66 88 is owned by Vietnam. Generally, the number 01 is reserved for an ambassador's official vehicle.

The order of numbers is based on when they recognized Indonesia as a country. The United States was originally assigned CD 13; due to the stigma associated with the number 13, they asked the Indian delegation to exchange numbers.

The list of countries and organizations follows:

Consulates also use the same format but instead of using the letters CD, they use CC.

Some foreign countries and international-organization vehicles in Jakarta use the " B xxxxx yyy " format and a normal white on black plate. Where "xxxxx" stands for five random digits, and "yyy" stands for the country / organization code.

Vanity plates 

A few vehicle owners pay an extra amount of money to get a certain plate as their desire. Because the convention is not flexible to include a full word, people try creative uses of numbers and letters. For example, Idris Sardi, a violin player, uses (B 10 LA) for his vehicle. It is a play on the word BIOLA which means "violin" in Indonesian. Leoni, a famous actress and singer, uses L 30 NI for her car. Even the former President Megawati Soekarnoputri chooses "M 3 GA" for her personal vehicle, as the plate resembles her broadly-known nickname. Edhie Bhaskoro Yudhoyono, former President Yudhoyono's younger son, has "B 24 EB", which "EB" is being his name initial. With the new format of three suffix alphabets, many vanity or personal registration plates are possible to be created. For example, a Toyota Fortuner owner may choose the plate B 42 NER which sounds like B four-two-NER. Syahrini, an Indonesian singer, has "B 1 SYR" as her registration plate number, with "SYR" being her initials.

References

External links 

Undang-Undang Republik Indonesia Nomor 22 Tahun 2009 Tentang Lalu Lintas Dan Angkutan Jalan – law regulating registration plates, among other things 

 Indonesian license plates – Operation of Indonesian license plates 

Indonesia
Indonesia transport-related lists
Road transport in Indonesia
Registration plates